The Journal of Near Eastern Studies is an academic journal published by the University of Chicago Press, covering research on the ancient and medieval civilisations of the Near East, including their archaeology, art, history, literature, linguistics, religion, law, and science. JNES is devoted to the study of the civilizations of the Near East from prehistory to the end of the Ottoman period in 1922. JNES embraces a uniquely broad scope of time, place, and topic, including contributions from scholars of international reputation on topics in Assyriology, Egyptology, Hittitology, Hebrew Bible, and allied ancient studies, as well as a second area of emphasis in early, medieval, and early-modern Islamic studies. The disciplinary range of the journal runs from history and language to religion and literature to archaeology and art history.

The Journal of Near Eastern Studies was founded in 1884, with an original emphasis on Old Testament studies. The journal was renamed twice over the course of the following century, with each name change reflecting the growth and expansion of the fields covered by the publication. Originally titled Hebraica, the journal in 1895 became the American Journal of Semitic Languages and Literatures; the present title came about in 1942.

JNES is published twice yearly by the University of Chicago Press. The journal evaluates manuscripts through a double-blind peer review process. Every issue includes new scholarly work as well as a book review section, which provides a critical overview of new publications by emerging and established scholars.

History
The journal was established in 1884 by William Rainey Harper as Hebraica. In 1895 it was renamed the American Journal of Semitic Languages and Literatures, obtaining its current name in 1942.  Originally published quarterly, it has been biannual  since 2010, but at significantly expanded length and new format.

See also

External links
 
 Index of volumes 1-55 (1942-1996)
 Journal Of Near Eastern Studies at Near Eastern Languages and Civilizations, Division of the Humanities, University of Chicago

University of Chicago Press academic journals
Publications established in 1884
Middle Eastern studies journals
Biannual journals
English-language journals